Sarah Simpson (died December 27, 1739) was a widow executed by hanging for the murder of her child in New Hampshire. She was executed with Penelope Kenny, who was also convicted of killing her child.

See also
 Capital punishment in New Hampshire
 Capital punishment in the United States
 List of people executed in New Hampshire

References

External links
Executions in the U.S. 1608-1987: The Espy File (by state) (PDF)

1739 deaths
18th-century executions of American people
American female criminals
American female murderers
American murderers
American murderers of children
American people convicted of murder
Executed American women
Filicides in the United States
People convicted of murder by New Hampshire
People executed by New Hampshire by hanging
People executed by the Province of New Hampshire
People executed by the Thirteen Colonies by hanging
People executed for murder
Year of birth missing